Antarchaea is a genus of moths of the family Noctuidae.

Selected species
Antarchaea digramma (Walker, 1863)
Antarchaea erubescens A. Bang-Haas, 1910
Antarchaea flavissima Hacker & Saldaitis, 2010
Antarchaea fragilis (Butler, 1875)
Antarchaea malhamana Hacker & Fibiger, 2006
Antarchaea signifera Hampson, 1926
Antarchaea straminea Hampson, 1926
Antarchaea terminalis (Mabille, 1880)

References
Natural History Museum Lepidoptera genus database

Catocalinae
Noctuoidea genera